Aurelia Trywiańska-Kollasch (born 9 May 1976 in Szczecin) is a former Polish athlete specializing in the 100 meters hurdles. She finished fifth at the 2003 World Championships, the 2006 European Championships and the 2006 World Cup. She also competed in the 2004 Olympics, but did not progress from her heat. In 60 metres hurdles she finished seventh at the 2007 European Indoor Championships.

Her personal best time is 12.73 seconds, achieved in July 2003 in Zagreb.

Competition record

External links
 

1976 births
Living people
Polish female hurdlers
Athletes (track and field) at the 2004 Summer Olympics
Athletes (track and field) at the 2008 Summer Olympics
Olympic athletes of Poland
Sportspeople from Szczecin